William Junior Beechers (born 1 June 1987) is an English former professional footballer.

Biography
Born in Oxford, Beechers joined the youth team at Oxford United, making his debut as a 59th-minute substitute in a match at Lincoln City on 5 February 2005. After playing four league games, he was loaned to Oxford City in November 2006, but was recalled in January 2007. He was released by Oxford in May 2007 and signed for Abingdon United in July 2007. He remained at Abingdon until signing for Oxford City in 2010.

References

External links

1987 births
Living people
Footballers from Oxford
English footballers
Association football forwards
Oxford United F.C. players
Abingdon United F.C. players
Oxford City F.C. players
English Football League players